Eleocharis uniglumis is a species of plant belonging to the family Cyperaceae.

Its native range is Europe to Russian Far East and Nepal, Subarctic America to Northern USA.

References

uniglumis